Saint Sarkis Cathedral may refer to:

Saint Sarkis Cathedral, Yerevan
Saint Sarkis Cathedral, Tehran
Saint Sarkis Church, Nor Nork
Saint Sarkis Church of Ashtarak
Saint Sarkis Church of Tsovinar
Saint Sarkis Church, Tbilisi
Saint Sarkis Monastery of Gag
Saint Sarkis Monastery of Ushi
Tekor Basilica
St. Sarkis Church (Dearborn, Michigan)